John Henderson Lamont (November 12, 1865 – March 10, 1936) was a Canadian lawyer, politician, and Justice of the Supreme Court of Canada.

Born in Horning's Mills, Canada West (now Ontario), the son of Duncan Carmichael Lamont and Margaret Robson Henderson, he received a Bachelor of Arts degree in 1892 and a Bachelor of Law degree in 1893 from the University of Toronto. In 1893, he was called to the Bar of Ontario.

Career 
He practised law in Toronto until 1899 when he moved to Prince Albert, Northwest Territories (now Saskatchewan) and co-founded a law firm.

In 1902, he became a Crown Prosecutor. In 1904, he was elected as a Liberal candidate to the House of Commons of Canada representing the riding of Saskatchewan (Provisional District), Northwest Territories. In this election he defeated Conservative Thomas McKay who had been elected first mayor of Prince Albert in the 1880s. He resigned on September 5, 1905 and was elected as a Liberal to represent the district of Prince Albert City in the first election of the Legislative Assembly of Saskatchewan. He was also appointed Attorney General. In 1907, he was appointed to the Supreme Court of Saskatchewan. From 1918 to 1927, he was a Justice of the Saskatchewan Court of Appeal. On April 2, 1927, he was appointed to the Supreme Court of Canada. He served until his death in 1936.

Lamont, Alberta is named in his honour.

External links
 Supreme Court of Canada biography
 

Justices of the Supreme Court of Canada
Liberal Party of Canada MPs
Members of the House of Commons of Canada from Saskatchewan
Members of the House of Commons of Canada from the Northwest Territories
1865 births
1936 deaths
Saskatchewan Liberal Party MLAs
Attorneys-General of Saskatchewan
University of Toronto alumni
University of Toronto Faculty of Law alumni